ServusTV is a TV station based in Wals-Siezenheim in the Austrian state of Salzburg.
Its name is derived from the popular greeting servus common in many parts of Central and Eastern Europe. Together with the magazine "Servus in Stadt und Land", it is owned by Red Bull Media House GmbH, a subsidiary of Red Bull GmbH. The station emerged in 2009 from the station Salzburg TV, which was founded in 1995.

In Austria Servus TV is distributed by DVB-T2 and Astra-Satellit, as well as via digital cable provider A1 Kabel TV and some German digital cable networks

History 
The history of the station dates back on the first private TV station in Austria. Started as Salzburg TV in 1995 it was initially available only by cable in Salzburg. The TV station got media attention as it started terrestrial transmission on 25 October 2000, which was illegal at that time in Austria. The transmission facility, located at Untersberg transmitter (owned by Germany, but physically located in Austria), was confiscated by Austrian authorities after five days. As a protest, the owner of Salzburg TV entered a hunger strike for two weeks. As a response, terrestrial transmission of private TV stations was legalized in Austria, and transmission restarted in 2002 from the old transmission site on UHF channel 36.

The TV station was sold in 2004 to prevent its bankruptcy. In 2007 the shares went to Red Bull GmbH. The original owners sold their shares on the station soon after, and in 2009 the station was renamed to Servus TV.

On May 3, 2016, Red Bull Media House announced that it would cease broadcasting for economic reasons. The discussed establishment of a work council was decisive for this. Red Bull founder Dietrich Mateschitz later stated that the impending establishment of a works council was "not exactly useful" for the station's independence. He went on to comment that the works council came about "anonymously, supported by the union and the Chamber of Labor".  After almost all employees spoke out in writing against a works council the next day and asked Mateschitz to continue the channel in a video message, Mateschitz announced one day later that he had reversed his decision.

Political direction 
The TV station is regularly credited with being close to the right-wing milieu. As part of the talk show “Talk im Hangar 7”, the broadcaster invited the leading figure of the neo-fascist identitarian movement (IB) Martin Sellner to a panel discussion on the topic "How dangerous are our Muslims?".

In his weekly commentary series “Der Wegscheider”, the director of Servus TV Ferdinand Wegscheider spreads controversial and unsubstantiated information about the COVID-19 pandemic. A frequently used style element is the posing of rhetorical questions. For example, he explained that the vaccination was “insufficiently tested” and contained “genetically modified substances”. He further claimed that the administration of the antiparasitic ivermectin would be an adequate therapy. In 2021, the press club Concordia filed an official complaint against the broadcaster at the communications authority of Austria (Kommunikationsbehörde Austria).

A recurring guest of ServusTV was the microbiologist and corona trivializer Sucharit Bhakdi.

Availability
ServusTV is available via terrestrial transmission in Austria, as well as Europe-wide from the Astra 19.2°E satellite constellation.

Sports
ServusTV airs ice hockey on Sunday nights, with the Austrian Hockey League in Austria and the Deutsche Eishockey Liga in Germany. It also airs the FIM MotoGP World Championship, and will add the UEFA Champions League and Formula 1 in 2021. It previously aired the World Rally Championship, Red Bull Air Race and Red Bull X-Fighters.

References

External links
 

Red Bull
Television stations in Austria
Television stations in Germany
Mass media in Salzburg
German-language television stations